Henry V. Jardine is an American diplomat and former military officer who has served as the United States ambassador to Mauritius and Seychelles since February 2023.

Early life and education

Jardine earned a Bachelor of Science degree from the Georgetown University School of Foreign Service and a Master of Science from the National Defense University.

Career

Jardine is a career member of the Senior Foreign Service, with the rank of minister-counselor. He serves as the director of the Office for Career Development and Assignments in Washington, D.C. as part of the United States Department of State. Jardine previously served the principal deputy director of the Bureau of Overseas Buildings Operations for the State Department, as well as the executive director of the Bureau for Western Hemisphere Affairs. Other overseas assignments include management counselor of the U.S. embassy in Bangkok, Thailand, deputy chief of mission of the U.S. embassy in Tirana, Albania, and consul general of the U.S. consulate general in Kolkata, India. He also served at the U.S. consulate general in Chiang Mai, Thailand, the U.S. embassy in Bridgetown, Barbados, and the U.S. embassy, in Dhaka, Bangladesh. Jardine also served in the U.S. Army from 1989 to 1993.

United States ambassador to Mauritius and Seychelles 

On July 6, 2022, President Joe Biden nominated Jardine to serve as the next ambassador to Mauritius and Seychelles. On November 29, 2022, hearings on his nomination were held before the Senate Foreign Relations Committee. On December 7, 2022, the committee favorably reported his nomination to the Senate. On December 13, 2022, his nomination was confirmed in the Senate by voice vote. He was sworn in by Acting Deputy Secretary John R. Bass on January 19, 2023, and presented his credentials to the President of Mauritius on February 22, 2023. He is awaiting his presentation of credentials to the president of Seychelles.

Personal life
Jardine speaks Bengali, Thai, Spanish, German, and Albanian.

References

Living people
21st-century American diplomats
Year of birth missing (living people)
American consuls
Georgetown University alumni
National Defense University alumni
United States Army soldiers
United States Department of State officials
United States Foreign Service personnel